Recherche is a rural locality in the local government area of Huon Valley in the South-east region of Tasmania. The 2016 census has a population of 8 for the state suburb of Recherche.

History
Recherche is a confirmed suburb/locality.

Geography
The Tasman Sea forms much of the eastern boundary.

Road infrastructure
The C636 route (South Cape Road / Cockle Creek Road) enters from the north-east and runs generally south until it reaches the south-eastern corner, where it ends.

References

Localities of Huon Valley Council
Towns in Tasmania